The Siberians or Siberiaks, are the majority inhabitants of Siberia, as well as the Sub-ethnic or ethnographic group of the Russians.

As demonym

The demonym Siberian can be restricted to either the Russian Siberiaks or the indigenous minority, but it can also refer to any inhabitant of Siberia, irrespective of ethnic or national background.

As sub-ethnic group

In ethnology the term is often used to refer to the Old-Timers (Starozhily or old settlers ) - the earliest Russian population of Siberia during its Russian conquest in the 16th–17th centuries and their descendants. Later settlers, especially the second half of the 19th – early 20th centuries, were called "the Russian" (Siberian dialects: "Raseyskie") by the Siberians.

The dialects of the Siberians were formed mainly on the basis of Northern Russian dialects.

Ideologues of Siberian regionalism (Siberian nationalism) considered the Siberians to be a separate people from the Russians. Among contemporary ethnologists there are both opponents and supporters of this point of view. In 1918, under the control of the Siberian regionalists, there was a short-term state formation "Siberian Republic".

In the course of 2002 and 2010 Russian Census, the ethnonym "Siberiak" was indicated as the main one by a small number of respondents.

See also
 Kamchadals
 Kamenschik
 Semeiskie

Footnotes

Bibliography
 
 
 
 
 
 

Ethnic groups in Siberia
Russian sub-ethnic groups